University Teaching Department Ground is a multi purpose stadium in Sagar, Madhya Pradesh. The ground is mainly used for organizing matches of football, cricket and other sports. The stadium has hosted a Ranji Trophy match in 1982 when Madhya Pradesh cricket team played against Rajasthan cricket team. but since then the stadium has hosted non-first-class matches.

References

External links 

 cricketarchive
 cricinfo
 Wikimapia
 Department of Physical Education

University sports venues in India
Sagar, Madhya Pradesh
Cricket grounds in Madhya Pradesh
Sports venues in Madhya Pradesh
Sports venues completed in 1982
1982 establishments in Madhya Pradesh
Football venues in Madhya Pradesh
20th-century architecture in India